The list of historic places in Canada contains heritage sites listed on the Canadian Register of Historic Places (CRHP), all of which are designated as historic places either locally, provincially, territorially, nationally, or by more than one level of government. For convenience, the list is divided by province or administrative entities. Since there are thousands of historic places in Canada, this is an editorial choice and not official.

Lists

Provinces 

 List of historic places in Alberta
 List of historic places in British Columbia
 List of historic places in Manitoba
 List of historic places in New Brunswick
 List of historic places in Newfoundland and Labrador
 List of historic places in Nova Scotia
 List of historic places in Ontario
 List of historic places in Prince Edward Island
 List of historic places in Quebec
 List of historic places in Saskatchewan

Territories 

 List of historic places in the Northwest Territories
 List of historic places in Nunavut
 List of historic places in Yukon

See also 

 National Historic Sites of Canada